Alfred Bel (14 May 1873, Salins-les-Bains – 18 February 1945, Meknes, aged 71) was a French orientalist and scholar of Arab culture.

Works 
 Les Benou Ghanya et leur lutte contre l'Empire almohade, Paris, Leroux, 1903.
 Tlemcen et ses environs, guide illustré du touriste, Oran, Fouque, 1908.
 Histoire des Beni 'Abd-el-Wâd, rois de Tlemcen, par Abou Zakariya Yahia Ibn Khaldoun, texte et traduction, 2 vol., Alger, Fontana frères, 1913.
 with Prosper Ricard, Le travail de la laine à Tlemcen, Alger, Jourdan, 1913.
 Un atelier de poterie de de faïences au Xe siècle de J.-C. découvert à Tlemcen, Constantine, Braham, 1914.
 Le Maroc pittoresque : Fès, Meknès et Régions, Paris, 1917.
 Les industries de la céramique à Fès, Alger et Paris, Carbonel et Leroux, 1918.
 Catalogue des livres arabes de la bibliothèque de la mosquée d'El Qarawiyin, Fès, Imprimerie municipale, 1918.
 with Mohammed Bencheneb, Takmilat es-sila d'Ibn El 'Abbar, texte arabe, Alger, Fontana, 1920.
 Zahrat el-as (la fleur du myrte), fondation de la ville de Fès, par Abou I-Hasan 'Ali Djaznaï, texte et traduction, Alger, Carbonel, 1923.
 La religion musulmane en Berbérie, t. I, « Établissement et développement de l'Islam en Berbérie du VIIe au XXe siècle », Paris, Librairie orientaliste Paul Geuthner, 1938.

References 

1873 births
1945 deaths
French orientalists
French Arabists
People from Jura (department)